The Mahakirau River is a river of the Coromandel Peninsula in New Zealand's North Island. It flows east from its source in the Coromandel Range, reaching the sea at Whitianga Harbour southwest of Whitianga.

See also
List of rivers of New Zealand

References
 

Thames-Coromandel District
Rivers of Waikato
Rivers of New Zealand